Strawberry Road (28 September 1979 – 1 June 1995) was a champion Australian Thoroughbred racehorse who went on to race in Germany, France, the United States, and Japan.  Bred in New South Wales, he was by the 'superbly-bred' Whiskey Road (Nijinsky-Bowl of Flowers) out of Giftisa (by Rich Gift - a grandson of Nasrullah and Abernant).

Racing career

In Australia
Trained by Doug Bougoure, Strawberry Road had two starts late in his two-year-old season before making a winning start to the new season on 11 August 1982, in the Queensland Maiden Handicap at Eagle Farm.  Following a spell, he progressed from an Improvers to a Graduation with four wins in a row.  Taken to Sydney, and stepped up to stakes company, he finished second to Marscay (the previous year's Golden Slipper winner) in the Hobartville Stakes, and, after two further lead-up runs, recorded his first Group One wins in the Rosehill Guineas and the AJC Derby.  Back in Queensland, following a brief let-up, Strawberry Road won three of his four starts, including the Queensland Derby.  After recording 10 wins for the season, including three in Group One races, Strawberry Road was named Australia's champion racehorse for the 1982–1983 season.

In the spring, Strawberry Road campaigned in Melbourne, and, interspersed with defeats at Caulfield, won the Freeway Stakes, the Centennial Stakes, and the Cox Plate.  In the autumn, Strawberry Road failed to find his best form, and, after 26 starts in Australia, which produced 13 wins, three seconds, and three-thirds, a controlling interest was sold to Ray Stehr and John Singleton, who exported him to France.

International Campaigns
Trained by John Nicholls, Strawberry Road won the Grosser Preis von Baden in Germany in 1984.  He then finished fifth in the Prix de l'Arc de Triomphe in France, third and fourth, respectively, in the Washington, D.C. International Stakes and the Breeders' Cup Turf in the United States, and closed the year with a seventh in the Japan Cup, ridden by the great English jockey Lester Piggott.

Strawberry Road returned to France in 1985, and, under new trainer Patrick Biancone, won the Prix d'Harcourt.  He was then sold to prominent French horseman Daniel Wildenstein, for whom he won the Grand Prix de Saint-Cloud.  Wildenstein then sent Strawberry Road to the United States, where he ran second to the champion Pebbles, by a neck, in the Breeders' Cup Turf.  Sold to Allen Paulson and Bruce McNall, Strawberry Road remained in the United States, and was trained by Hall of Fame trainer Charlie Whittingham.

Now seven, Strawberry Road recorded the last feature win of his career in the Arcadia Handicap at California's Santa Anita Park in 1986.

At Stud
Retired to stud by Paulson (now his sole owner), at his Brookside Farm in Versailles, Kentucky, Strawberry Road was a highly successful sire.  His 368 progeny included 233 winners, and among the most successful were:

 Dinard (b. 1988) - Won 1991 Santa Anita Derby, San Rafael Stakes 
 Fraise (b. 1988) - Won the 1992 Breeders' Cup Turf
 Escena (b. 1993) - Won 1998 Breeders' Cup Distaff
 Ajina (b. 1994) - Won 1997 Breeders' Cup Distaff

Strawberry Road is also the damsire of:

 Vindication (b. 2000) - The 2002 American Champion Two-Year-Old Colt and winner of the Breeders' Cup Juvenile
 Affluent (b. 1998) - Winner of four American Grade One races and prize money of more than US$1.4 million

In 1995, Strawberry Road contracted a bacterial infection that led to peritonitis and pneumonia.  In a weakened condition, he fell in his stall, fracturing the femur in his right hindleg, and had to be euthanised.

Pedigree

References

External links
 Strawberry Road's pedigree and racing stats
 Strawberry Road profile at the Royal Agricultural Society of Queensland website
 Complete profile and statistics on Strawberry Road by equine photographer Jenny Barnes

1979 racehorse births
1995 racehorse deaths
Racehorses bred in Australia
Racehorses trained in Australia
Cox Plate winners
Australian Champion Racehorse of the Year
Australian Racing Hall of Fame horses
Thoroughbred family 18